The Ganquan Palace or Sweet Spring Palace was a Qin dynasty (221–207 BCE) imperial palace with later additions by Emperor Wu of Han in 138 BCE. It was a temporary imperial residence (离宫, lígōng) outside the capital, which was Xianyang for the Qin and Chang'an for the Han. Its ruins are located in Chunhua County, Xianyang, Shaanxi, China. It is a Major Historical and Cultural Site Protected at the National Level.

References

Major National Historical and Cultural Sites in Shaanxi
Ruins in China
Palaces in China
Qin dynasty architecture
Han dynasty architecture
Xianyang